Latchezar Stantchev is a Bulgarian poet who first became well-known in the 1930s. He is also a well-known translator, journalist, and publisher of children's magazines. He was born on September 12, 1908, in the resort town of Varshetz, located in North-west Bulgaria. He died on March 13, 1992, in Sofia. Latchezar Stantchev graduated from Sofia University with a major in French Philology and specialized in French Literature at the Sorbonne in Paris from 1937 to 1939. While in Paris, he was the correspondent of the Bulgarian newspaper Zarya. He was the founder and general editor of the Slaveyche children's magazine (1957-1968), 120,000 issues of which were published monthly.

Short bibliography 
Bezshumni dni (Silent days), 1930
Prolet na boulevarda (Printemps sur le boulevard), 1933
Hora po strehite (Gens sur les toits), 1935
Zemya pod slantse (Terre sous le soleil), 1939
Vlubeni bulevardi (Les boulevards), 1993
Paris pod slantse (Paris sous le soleil), 1998

External links
 Some of his poems (in Bulgarian) Лъчезар Станчев

References

1908 births
1992 deaths
Sofia University alumni
University of Paris alumni
Bulgarian male poets
Bulgarian translators
20th-century translators
20th-century Bulgarian poets
20th-century male writers